The Fishermen's Hospital is a Grade I listed building in Great Yarmouth, Norfolk, England. It was established by the Corporation of Great Yarmouth in 1702 to look after 20 old and decayed fishermen and their wives.

References

External links
 Fishermen's Hospital at Norfolk Heritage Explorer

Great Yarmouth